Wagga City Wanderers is a semi-professional Australian association football club based in the city of Wagga Wagga, New South Wales. The club was founded in 2014 and as of 2019 the men compete in the ACT based National Premier Leagues Capital Football 2 and its female division compete in the ACT National Premier Leagues Capital Football NPLW.

History

Foundation and early years
Wagga City Wanderers was established in October 2014 by Football Wagga Wagga Association to grow football in the Wagga Wagga, Riverina and surrounding areas by participating in the State League competition administered by Football NSW

In the first year of competition Wagga City Wanderers was represented by a men's first grade and under 20 team with this expanding to include under 18s over the following seasons.

Wagga City Wanderers also conduct development programs through the Wanderers Academy and competes with SAP 9–12 years boys and girls and under 13-16 junior boys and girls teams. The Academy consists of approximately 220 young players in State competitions & gala days including having the largest representation of any club at the 2017 Kanga Cup.

Relationship with Sydney FC

The Wagga City Wanderers and Football Wagga Wagga are partners with Sydney FC. This includes access to various opportunities associated with Sydney FC.

Move to NPL and NPL Womens Capital Football
Prior to the 2019 Capital Football season, Capital Football announced the inclusion of Wagga City into the newly formed NPL 2 competition to replace the Capital League . The women's division has debuted in 2019 with the NPLW program comprising U13's, U15's, U17's, Reserves and First Grade divisions.

Players

Current squad

Season-by-season results
The below table is updated with the statistics and final results for Wagga City Wanderers following the conclusion of each season.

References

External links

 Wagga City Wanderers home
 NPL Capital Football home
 Capital Football home

Association football clubs established in 2014
2014 establishments in Australia
Soccer clubs in the Australian Capital Territory
Soccer clubs in New South Wales
National Premier Leagues clubs
Sport in Wagga Wagga